Boney's Funky Christmas is the first Christmas album and fourth studio album by jazz saxophonist Boney James, released in 1996.

Track listing

Personnel 
 Boney James – all other instruments except where noted, tenor saxophone (1, 2, 3, 5, 7, 8, 9), alto saxophone (4), Yamaha WX7 (4), soprano saxophone (6)
 Michael Egizi – keyboards (2)
 David Torkanowsky – keyboards (3, 5)
 Randy Kerber – keyboards (4)
 Dan Shea – keyboards (6), drum programming (6)
 Jeff Carruthers – keyboards (7, 9), drum programming (7, 9)
 Greg Karukas – keyboards (8)
 Dwight Sills – guitars (2, 8, 9)
 Bob De Marco – wah wah guitar (2)
 Paul Jackson Jr. – guitars (7)
 Alex Al – bass (3, 4, 5, 8), synth bass (4)
 Donnell Spencer – drum fills (2), drums (8)
 Paul Brown – drum programming (3, 4, 5)
 Paulinho da Costa – percussion (1, 3, 9)
 Lenny Castro – percussion (2, 7)
 Rick Braun – trumpet (9)
 Dee Harvey – vocals (2)
 Jim Gilstrap – vocals (7)
 Leslie Smith – vocals (7)
 Bobby Caldwell – vocals (8)

Arrangements
 Boney James (1, 3, 5, 8, 9)
 Michael Egizi (2)
 Paul Brown (3, 5, 8, 9)
 David Torkanowsky (3, 5)
 Jerry Hey (4)
 Dan Shea (6)
 Jeff Carruthers (7, 9)
 Greg Karukas (8)

Production 
 Boney James – producer 
 Paul Brown – producer, recording, mixing 
 Dan Shea – additional engineer 
 Charles Nasser – recording assistant 
 Gordon Suffield – recording assistant 
 Terri Wong – recording assistant 
 Stephen Marcussen – mastering at  Precision Mastering (Hollywood, California)
 Lexy Brewer – production coordinator 
 Stine Schyberg – art direction, design 
 Kip Lott – photography

References 

1996 Christmas albums
Warner Records albums
Boney James albums
Christmas albums by American artists
Jazz Christmas albums